Citharomangelia richardi is a species of sea snail, a marine gastropod mollusk in the family Mangeliidae.

Description
The length of the shell varies between 5 mm and 9 mm.

The shell has a biconic-fusiform shape. It shows 7-9 axial ribs on the later whorls. The spiral striae can only be seen under a lens. The outer lip has 9-12 plicae, with the posterior one nodiform.

Distribution
This marine species occurs in the Indo-Pacific off KwaZulu-Natal, South Africa, Mozambique; also off Japan and New Caledonia.

References

 Crosse, H. 1869. Diagnoses Molluscorum Novae Caledoniae. J. Conchyliol. 17: 177–180.

External links
  Tucker, J.K. 2004 Catalog of recent and fossil turrids (Mollusca: Gastropoda). Zootaxa 682:1-1295.
 
 MNHN, Paris: syntype

richardi
Gastropods described in 1869